Tingatinga may refer to:

 Tingatinga (painting), an east-African painting genre
 Edward Saidi Tingatinga, founder of the genre 
 Tingatinga Arts Cooperative Society (formerly "Tingatinga Society"), an art school founded by E.S. Tingatinga to promote the painting genre
 Tingatinga (Tanzanian ward)
 Tinga Tinga Tales, a television cartoon series about animals